The 1957 Grand National was the 111th renewal of the Grand National horse race that took place at Aintree near Liverpool, England, on 29 March 1957.

It was won by 20/1 shot Sundew, having led the field for much of the race. Sundew was ridden by jockey Fred Winter and trained by Frank Hudson. It was Winter's third attempt at winning the Grand National, and Sundew had run in the steeplechase twice before.

Thirty-five horses ran, including last year's winner E.S.B. all returned safely to the stables.

Finishing order

Non-finishers

References

 1957
Grand National
Grand National
Grand National
20th century in Lancashire